Jay Orpin (born April 29, 1976, in Stockholm, Sweden) is a Swedish and Finnish songwriter and producer. He also writes songs and produced for Backstreet Boys, NSYNC, Robyn, Ace of Base, Bon Jovi, 2gether and Britney Spears, and later he produced songs for Good Charlotte, Sum 41, Simple Plan, Hawthorne Heights, Red Jumpsuit Apparatus, My Chemical Romance, Tokio Hotel, Lindsay Lohan, Dashboard Confessional, All American Rejects, Fall Out Boy, AFI, Evanescence, Hollywood Undead, t.A.T.u., Yellowcard, Hannah Montana, Linkin Park, Bullet for My Valentine and Taking Back Sunday.  Most of his music is under the influence of today's modern pop punk, dance-punk, and emo music, but he does write some pop and hip-hop music as well.  He also teamed up with Travis Barker in 2007, remixing popular hip-hop singles such as Throw Some D's, Party Like a Rockstar, and Crank That Soulja Boy.    Even though he has written some of the works of some of the aforementioned artists, he is not one of the main producers of many of these artists and he chooses not to put his credit for his work.  An original song written by such composer to be cited is yet to be found, however some has claimed an abbreviation of his name in one of the albums.  In late 2008, he has decided to move in a small town near Oulu, Finland to raise his family and is a high school teacher and does accounting for bill paying in the summer to support the family, along with music production projects part-time, but he still continues to produce music today, but not as much as he used to.  He did come back to help write a few new songs, such as In My Head by Jason Derulo.  He has quit his part-time job in accounting to allow more time back in the music production business, to make a revival.

Hawthorne Heights
One of his most prominent projects is producing the band and influencing the style of the American band Hawthorne Heights. He did some marketing and helped the band members make a more marketable sound, by making the sound of the earlier albums he helped produce Bon Jovi with Max Martin and adding the rock flavor to it. That rock sound made the two premier Hawthorne Heights albums become massively popular. One of his biggest masterpieces, Ohio Is for Lovers made a massive sensation throughout adolescence as an anthem of teen angst.  Hawthorne Heights has cited the producer with the slogan "Pop is Dead" in advertisement, to generally prove that the manufactured boy band pop era is dead along with a protest of his production of many corporate pop punk bands that made the charts around 2004.  While most of the music he produces is generally American, he produces bands from Germany, Russia, France, Sweden, Canada, Finland, Australia, and the United Kingdom.  His work for t.A.T.u. and Tokio Hotel made the popularity of t.A.T.u. rise in Finland and Sweden.

References 

Swedish record producers
Swedish songwriters
1976 births
Living people